Norman Arthur Jensen (born 24 November 1945), a former Australian politician, was a member of the first multi-member single electorate unicameral Australian Capital Territory Legislative Assembly representing the Residents Rally party, serving between 1989 and 1992.

Biography
He worked as a bank officer in the National Australia Bank and served in the Australian Army for 22 years after being called up for National Service in April 1966. A graduate of the Officer Training Unit in 1966 he graduated into the Royal Australian Infantry Corps serving in South Vietnam with the 2nd and 3rd Battalions of the Royal Australian Regiment in 1967–68. He later transferred to the Australian Intelligence Corp and reached the rank of Major. Since retiring to the Sunshine Coast in 2004 he has become active as a member of Lions Clubs International and was elected to the position of District Governor for District 201Q3 in 2016–2017.

Jensen was elected at the 1989 general election and unsuccessfully sought re-election at the 1992 general election. After his term of office ended, Jensen was employed in the Australian Public Service until his retirement to the Sunshine Coast in 2004.

References

Members of the Australian Capital Territory Legislative Assembly
1945 births
Living people
Australian Army officers
Australian National University alumni
Residents Rally members of the Australian Capital Territory Legislative Assembly